Buffalo Municipal Airport  is a city-owned public-use airport located one nautical mile north of the central business district of Buffalo, a city in Dallas County, Missouri, United States.

Facilities and aircraft 

For the 12-month period ending June 30, 2009, the airport had 1,650 aircraft operations, an average of 137 per month: 98.5% general aviation and 1.5% military.
At that time there were 7 aircraft based at this airport: 86% single-engine and 14% multi-engine.

References

External links 
  from MoDOT Airport Directory
 Aerial photo as of 1 April 1996 from USGS The National Map
 

Airports in Missouri
Buildings and structures in Dallas County, Missouri